Daniel Cumming (born 8 December 1960) is an Australian wrestler. He competed in the men's freestyle 62 kg at the 1988 Summer Olympics.

References

External links
 

1960 births
Living people
Australian male sport wrestlers
Olympic wrestlers of Australia
Wrestlers at the 1988 Summer Olympics
Place of birth missing (living people)
Commonwealth Games medallists in wrestling
Commonwealth Games silver medallists for Australia
Wrestlers at the 1986 Commonwealth Games
20th-century Australian people
21st-century Australian people
Medallists at the 1986 Commonwealth Games